Pietramelara is a comune (municipality) in the Province of Caserta in the Italian region Campania, located about  north of Naples and about  northwest of Caserta.  It occupies the plain just south the slopes of Monte Maggiore, the highest peak in the Monti Trebulani.

Pietramelara borders the following municipalities: Formicola, Pietravairano, Riardo, Roccaromana, Rocchetta e Croce.

References

Cities and towns in Campania